Aquae Calidae (Latin for warm waters), also known as Therma and Thermopolis in the Middle Ages, was an ancient town in Thrace located in the territory of today's Bulgarian port city of Burgas on the Black Sea. It was built around thermal baths using the hot springs and became one of the most important spa centres of ancient times.

The site and baths of Aquae Calidae have been visited in the course of history by several important rulers from Philip II of Macedon to the Eastern Roman emperors Justinian I and Constantine IV, the Bulgarian ruler Tervel and the Ottoman sultan Suleiman the Magnificent.

Aquae Calidae is shown on the Tabula Peutingeriana (edition of Konrad Miller, 1887), an illustrated itinerarium (ancient Roman road map) showing the layout of the road network of the Roman Empire.

History
Archaeology has shown that the hot springs were already used in the Neolithic between the 6th and 5th millennium BC. The Thracians built a sanctuary of the Three Nymphs in the 1st millennium BC around the spring. In the 4th century BC Philip II of Macedon conquered the region and according to legend, he was a frequent guest there.

The over 4,000 coins found show the cosmopolitan nature of visitors from many regions of Europe as they originated from ancient Greece and Italy as well as from Kabyle, Mesambria (now Nessebar), Odessos, Histria, Tomis, Byzantium, Abdera, Maroneia and the islands of the Aegean, the oldest from Apollonia Pontica from the 5th century BC.

The first baths at the Sanctuary of the Three Nymphs originated when the Roman Empire under Lucullus conquered the region, during the Third Mithridatic War in 72 BC. Under Trajan (98-117) nearby Anchialos became the administrative centre of the region and the baths were expanded and extended with two more swimming pools. During this time the Via Pontica was built connecting Constantinople via Deultum, Anchialos, Aquae Calidae with Dorostorum and Sexaginta Prista on the Danube. Near the baths a road station (statio milliaria) was created with the name Aquae Calidae.

The Sanctuary of the Three Nymphs continued to exist next to the station and the Baths, and became known as the Nymphaeum of Anchialos. Under Septimius Severus in 209-211 three years of games and celebrations under the name of Severia Nymphaea took place in the baths. Games also took place in Aquae Calidae under the emperors Geta and Caracalla.

Jordanes, who lived in the 6th century, described in his work Getica the incursions of Gothic tribes on the southern Black Sea coast of Thrace in 270. He reported that the Goths, after the conquest of Anchialos, moved to hot springs ("aquarum calidarum")  from Anchialos and stayed there for several days to recover.

The baths were restored and expanded at the end of the 4th or early the 5th century. According to Procopius of Caesarea fortress walls were also built around the city under Emperor Justinian I as follows:

The Eastern Roman Emperor Tiberius II Constantine chose the city for the cure of a disease of his wife Anastasia. When this healing was successful in around 580, she gave the local church her imperial robes. In 584 the Avars under Khan Baian conquered Aquae Calidae, but Baian spared the baths at the request of his harem. In one of the churches of the city the Avars found the imperial robes of Anastasia and Baian took them and allegedly claimed control of the empire.

In the Middle Ages the city was known as Therma or Thermopolis and was often contested between the Bulgarian and Byzantine Empires. It was incorporated in Bulgaria in 705 along with the region Zagora, after it was ceded by the Byzantine emperor Justinian II to the Bulgarian khan Tervel. In 921, during the Byzantine–Bulgarian war of 913–927, the Byzantines launched a campaign that reached the city. The Byzantine commander Pothos Argyros sent a detachment to monitor the movements of the Bulgarians, which was ambushed and defeated by the Bulgarian army.

In 1205 the Bulgarian emperor Kaloyan defeated the Crusader Latin Empire and captured their emperor Baldwin I, who died in captivity in the Bulgarian capital Tarnovo. In response, his successor Henry launched a retaliatory campaign against the Bulgarian cities south of the Balkan Mountains. In 1206 he captured Thermopolis and burned it. His commander Geoffrey of Villehardouin wrote: "This was a very beautiful city, well situated, with many warm springs for bathing - the best in the whole world. We took great booty from it." The city never recovered, although the baths were restored.

Archaeology
The first archaeological excavations were by Bogdan Filov in 1910. In the pools he found over 4,000 coins of various eras, jewelry and other everyday items dated from the 5th to the 13th century.

Since 2008 large-scale excavation and reconstruction has taken place. By 2010, an area of more than 3,800 sq. m  was uncovered, including the ancient thermal spas, the north gate and parts of the 5m thick city walls.

The city covered 10 sq. km and the walled part some 2 sq. km.

In July 2011, an area of 36,000 m² was declared an archaeological reserve.

References

Sources 
 

Roman towns and cities in Bulgaria
Thracian sites
Burgas